Eleanore Amelie Barté (June 11, 1893 – November 15, 1946) was an American writer and illustrator of children's books.

Life
She was born in Milwaukee to Frank Barte, a machinist born in Wisconsin to German immigrants, and Anna H. Stakl or Steckl, born in Germany.

Selected works
Adventures in Girlhood. Philadelphia: The Penn Publishing Company, 1917.
The Tin Soldier.  Philadelphia: The Penn Publishing Company, 1919.  Reprinted by Grosset & Dunlap in 1921 and in 1926 by The Penn Publishing Company.
The Trumpeter Swan.  Illustrated by Alice Barker Stephens.  Philadelphia: The Penn Publishing Company, 1920.  Reprinted.
The Gay Cockade.  Philadelphia: The Penn Publishing Company, 1921.
The Dim Lantern.  Illustrated by Coles Phillips.  Philadelphia: The Penn Publishing Company, 1922.
Amend, Ottilie, and Barté, Eleanore. Jolly Jungle Jingles. P. F. Volland Company, 1929. 
Barté, Eleanore. John Hoe; Or, 'A Penny Saved' . New York: Frederick A. Stokes Co, 1938. 
Patrice, Margaret and Barté, Eleanore. Up the Shining Path. Milwaukee: Bruce Pub. Co, 1946.

References

Castagno, John. Artists as illustrators: an international directory with signatures and monograms, 1800-present. Metuchen, N.J.: Scarecrow, 1989. Page 29.

1893 births
1946 deaths
Artists from Milwaukee
20th-century American writers
American children's writers
American children's book illustrators
American people of German descent